Myripristis earlei, or Earle's soldierfish, is a species of soldierfish belonging to the genus Myripristis. It is found in the East Central Pacific Ocean in the Phoenix and Marquesas Islands. It was previously regarded as an insular variant of Myripristis berndti. It is named after ichthyologist John L. Earle, who was the first  to suspect that this was a separate species from M. berndti. It can be found in caves and under ledges, and feeds on zooplankton.

References

earlei
Fish of the Pacific Ocean
Taxa named by John Ernest Randall
Taxa named by Gerald R. Allen